Nikita Danilovich Nesterov (born 28 March 1993) is a Russian professional ice hockey defenceman for HC CSKA Moscow of the Kontinental Hockey League (KHL).

Playing career

Junior
Nesterov was selected by the Tampa Bay Lightning in the fifth round, 148th overall, of the 2011 NHL Entry Draft. He was also drafted by the Kontinental Hockey League (KHL)'s Traktor Chelyabinsk, who selected him in the first round, 22nd overall, of the 2010 KHL Junior Draft. He opted then to play two seasons with Chelyabinsk in the KHL.

On April 30, 2013, Nesterov was signed to a three-year, entry-level contract by the NHL's Lightning.

Professional
On December 31, 2014, Tampa Bay recalled Nesterov from the Syracuse Crunch, the team's American Hockey League (AHL) affiliate. He had played in 32 games with the Crunch during the 2014–15 season, recording three goals and 14 points with a +4 plus-minus rating and 26 penalty minutes. Before his call-up, Nesterov has played in 86 career AHL games, all with the Crunch over the past two seasons. He has seven goals and 30 points with 65 penalty minutes.

On December 31, 2014, the same day of his call-up, Nesterov made his NHL debut in a 5–1 Lightning victory over the Buffalo Sabres. He was a +1 and logged over 15 minutes of ice time during the game. On April 16, 2015, Nesterov played in his first career NHL playoff game recording his first playoff goal and point. On April 18, 2015, Nestrov recorded his first NHL playoff assist in a Tampa Bay Lightning 5-1 win over the Detroit Red Wings.

On October 16, 2015, the National Hockey League announced that it was suspending Nesterov for two games without pay for boarding Dallas Stars forward Curtis McKenzie. Nesterov was given a five-minute penalty and a game misconduct for checking McKenzie from behind for the incident that led to his suspension. As a result of the suspension, Nesterov forfeited $7,983.88 in pay.

On September 26, 2016, the Lightning announced the re-signing of Nesterov to a one-year contract worth $725,000. Nesterov appeared in 57 games the past season, recording three goals and nine points. He set career highs for games played, goals, assists, and points. He also appeared in nine 2016 Stanley Cup Playoff games, recording one assist and nine penalty minutes. Nesterov appeared in 84 career NHL games over two seasons with the Lightning, recording five goals and 16 points. Nesterov also appeared in 26 playoff games, recording a goal and seven points.

On January 26, 2017, the Lightning traded Nesterov to the Montreal Canadiens in exchange for Jonathan Racine and a 6th-round pick in the 2017 NHL Entry Draft.

Rumors were started about Nesterov's return to the KHL began when Traktor Chelyabinsk placed his name on the roster on their website, his former team, which is based in Nesterov's hometown. On July 6, 2017, Nesterov's agent posted a tweet stating that Nesterov had decided that he was going to return to Russia to play in the KHL. The following day it was announced that Nesterov agreed to a three-year contract with a KHL powerhouse club, CSKA Moscow.

At the conclusion of his three-year contract with CSKA, Nesterov as a free agent, returned to the NHL and signed a one-year, $700,000 contract with Canadian club, the Calgary Flames, on October 23, 2020. In his return to the NHL after three years, Nesterov made 38 appearances in the pandemic delayed  season, registering just four assists from the blueline as the club missed the post-season.

As a free agent, Nesterov opted to return to his previous club HC CSKA Moscow of the KHL, agreeing to a one-year contract on July 20, 2021.

International play

Nesterov has represented Russia in the World Junior Ice Hockey Championships and the World Ice Hockey Championships. On July 18, 2016, Nesterov was added to team Russia's 2016 World Cup of Hockey roster as a replacement for Slava Voynov. He is a member of the Olympic Athletes from Russia team at the 2018 Winter Olympics, this time together with Voynov.

On 23 January 2022, Nesterov was named to the roster to represent Russian Olympic Committee athletes at the 2022 Winter Olympics.

Personal life
He has a son, Kirill Nesterov, the namesake of his godfather, Kirill Kaprizov, who spent time with the elder Nesterov in the KHL.

Career statistics

Regular season and playoffs

International

Awards and honors

References

External links 

1993 births
Living people
Belye Medvedi Chelyabinsk players
Calgary Flames players
HC CSKA Moscow players
Montreal Canadiens players
Ice hockey players at the 2018 Winter Olympics
Ice hockey players at the 2022 Winter Olympics
Olympic ice hockey players of Russia
Medalists at the 2018 Winter Olympics
Medalists at the 2022 Winter Olympics
Olympic medalists in ice hockey
Olympic gold medalists for Olympic Athletes from Russia
Olympic silver medalists for the Russian Olympic Committee athletes
Russian ice hockey defencemen
Sportspeople from Chelyabinsk
Syracuse Crunch players
Tampa Bay Lightning draft picks
Tampa Bay Lightning players
Traktor Chelyabinsk players